KXLQ (1490 AM) is a radio station licensed to serve Indianola, Iowa.  The station is owned by Birach Broadcasting.  The station had been silent; however, it returned to the air on April 21, 2010. As of January 18, 2013, it was carrying a sports format, featuring programming from SB Nation Radio and ESPN Radio.

In May 2017 KXLQ changed their format from sports to regional Mexican, branded as "La Patrona 1490". (info taken from northpine.com)

The station was assigned the KXLQ call letters by the Federal Communications Commission on June 8, 1984.

Ownership
In July 2004, KXLQ Insight Sports LLC, which had been operating the station under a time brokerage agreement since March 26, 2004, made an agreement to buy the station from Warren Broadcasting for $360,000. This deal ultimately collapsed and the station was put back on the market.

In September 2005, Davidson Media Group (Peter Davidson, president) reached an agreement to buy KXLQ from Warren Broadcasting Inc. (Dwaine F. Meyer, president) for a reported sale of $425,000.

In March 2007, Birach Broadcasting Corporation, headed by President Sima Birach, reached an agreement to acquire KXLQ from Davidson Media Group as part of a two-station deal worth a reported $800,000.

In 2012, it began broadcasting Yahoo! Sports Radio and simulcasting local host Mary Tirrell's program from KBGG. In early 2013, it added ESPN Radio programming. It also serves as an affiliate for the New York Yankees, Chicago Bears, and Notre Dame Fighting Irish football and Nebraska Cornhuskers football.

On January 8, 2016, Radio Insight reported that 62 And Even II is acquiring KXLQ from Birach Broadcasting for $300,000. The buyers are made up of the owners and management team of Iowa-based construction company The Rasmussen Group. However, FCC reports indicated that the sale was never consummated and Birach Broadcasting remains the owner.

References

External links
La Patrona 106.9 & 1490 Facebook
Birach Broadcasting Corporation

XLQ
Birach Broadcasting Corporation stations